The Russian-Livonian War (1480-1481) was a conflict between the Livonian Order and the joined forces of the Grand Duchy of Moscow and the Pskov Republic for dominion over territories today identified with the Estonia–Russia border.

References 

Conflicts in 1480
15th century in the Grand Duchy of Moscow
15th-century military history of Russia
Wars of the Middle Ages